Smyth is a restaurant located in Chicago.

See also
 List of Michelin starred restaurants in Chicago

References

External links

Restaurants established in 2016
Restaurants in Chicago
Michelin Guide starred restaurants in Illinois
2016 establishments in Illinois